Yassıbağ can refer to:

 Yassıbağ, Bayramiç
 Yassıbağ, Gülnar